Frederick Thomas Robinson (15 May 1884 – 6 October 1971) was an Australian rules footballer who played with Essendon in the Victorian Football League (VFL).

Notes

External links 
		

1884 births
1971 deaths
Australian rules footballers from Melbourne
Essendon Football Club players
People from Brighton, Victoria